Dongji may refer to:

 Dongzhi (solar term)
 Dongji Island, Wangan Township, Penghu County (the Pescadores), Taiwan (Republic of China)
 , town in and subdivision of Kenli District, Dongying, Shandong, China
 Dongji, Zhejiang, town in and subdivision of Putuo District, Zhouhai, Zhejiang, China

See also
 Fuyuan Dongji Airport, Heilongjiang